Yesmukhanbet Balmaganbetuly Tolepbergen (born February 2, 1993) is a Kazakhstani professional ice hockey forward currently playing for the Saryarka Karagandy in the Supreme Hockey League (VHL).

Career statistics

Regular season

International

References

External links

Living people
1993 births
HC Astana players
Sportspeople from Karaganda
Kazakhstani ice hockey forwards
Snezhnye Barsy players
Saryarka Karagandy players